Jie Lu  is a scientist in the area of computational intelligence and Distinguished Professor at the University of Technology in Sydney.

She made fundamental contributions in the areas of fuzzy transfer learning, concept drift, data-driven decision support systems, and recommender systems. Her research has huge positive implications and significant impact on her research community and for society and economics.

From 2004 to 2006, she was associate professor, since 2007 she has a full professorship in the Faculty of Engineering and Information Technology at the University of Technology.

In September 2019 she was awarded with the Australian Laureate Fellowship.

Lu is editor-in-chief of the journal Knowledge-Based Systems published by Elsevier.

Lu was appointed an Officer of the Order of Australia in the 2023 Australia Day Honours, recognising her contribution to engineering, computer science and artificial intelligence.

References

External links 
 List of papers published by Jie Lu https://profiles.uts.edu.au/Jie.Lu/publications

Living people
Year of birth missing (living people)
Academic staff of the University of Technology Sydney
Curtin University alumni
Artificial intelligence researchers
Australian Fellows of the Royal Society
Australian editors
Academic journal editors
Officers of the Order of Australia